Aji Chy Bridge is a historic bridge in Northwest of Tabriz on the Aji Chay river. This bridge was used to connect Tabriz to the Northwestern parts of Iranian Azerbaijan and a major element on route to connect rest of country to Turkey and Russia. In this function it was a major element in connecting East and Western parts of the Silk road. The bridge has been restored and damaged numerous times during the course of history either by natural disasters or during the wars happened in the region. The latest major reconstruction of the bridge was performed in the 19th century during Abbas Mirza's governorship by architect Hadj-Seyed-Hossein Tajer. The bridge includes 16 spans with an overall length of 105 meters and width of 5 meters. Due to several times of restoration and reconstruction the bridge doesn't have a uniform architecture. Three spans out of 16 are semi circular shape while rest of the spans are in zig zag shape. Recently the restoration of the bridge was performed by Iranian Organization of Cultural Heritages and registered in Iranian national heritages with number 2516.

In second half of the last century a new bridge has been built next to the ancient bridge and traffic transferred to the new bridge. The old bridge is open only for pedestrian visitors.

References

Bridges in Iran
Buildings and structures in Tabriz
Transportation in East Azerbaijan Province